Blaž Blagotinšek (born 17 January 1994) is a Slovenian handball player who plays for Frisch Auf Göppingen and the Slovenian national team.

Career

Club
Blagotinšek was a member of Slovenian club RK Celje until 2016, when he joined Hungarian team Veszprém. In his last season with Celje, he scored 30 goals in the 2015–16 EHF Champions League.

National team
In 2012 he was for the first time a member of the Slovenian national team when he was only 18 years old. He played in qualifications for the 2014 European Championship.

Honours

Individual
 SEHA League All-Star Team Best Defensive Player: 2019–20, 2020–21

References

External links

1994 births
Living people
Slovenian male handball players
Sportspeople from Celje
Olympic handball players of Slovenia
Handball players at the 2016 Summer Olympics
Expatriate handball players
Slovenian expatriate sportspeople in Hungary
Slovenian expatriate sportspeople in Germany
Veszprém KC players
Frisch Auf Göppingen players
Handball-Bundesliga players